The market rate (or "going rate") for goods or services is the usual price charged for them in a free market. If demand goes up, manufacturers and laborers will tend to respond by increasing the price they require, thus setting a higher market rate. When demand falls, market rates also tend to fall (see Supply and demand).

See also 
 Interest
 Market price

External links
Business Dictionary

Free market